Ilya Vyacheslavovich Spitsyn (born 6 November 1987) is a former Russian professional football player.

Club career
He played in the Russian Football National League for FC Tambov in the 2016–17 season.

External links
 
 

1987 births
Footballers from Voronezh
Living people
Russian footballers
Association football midfielders
FC Fakel Voronezh players
FC Tambov players